Lee Isaac Chung (born October 19, 1978) is an American film director and screenwriter. His debut feature Munyurangabo (2007) was an Official Selection at the 2007 Cannes Film Festival and the first narrative feature film in the Kinyarwanda language. He also directed the feature films Lucky Life (2010) and Abigail Harm (2012). His semi-autobiographical film Minari (2020) won both the Grand Jury Prize and Audience Award at the 2020 Sundance Film Festival. For Minari, he received numerous other major awards and nominations, including the Golden Globe Award for Best Foreign Language Film and nominations for Best Director and Best Original Screenplay at the 93rd Academy Awards.

In 2023, he directed an episode in the third season of the Star Wars series The Mandalorian. He is also set to direct a sequel to the 1996 film Twister.

Early life and education
Chung was born on October 19, 1978, in Denver, to a family from South Korea. His family lived briefly in Atlanta before moving to a small farm in rural Lincoln, Arkansas. He attended Lincoln High School.

He is an alumnus of the U.S. Senate Youth Program. He attended Yale University to study biology. At Yale, with exposure to world cinema in his senior year, he dropped his plans for medical school to pursue film-making. He later pursued graduate studies in film-making at the University of Utah.

Career 
Chung's directorial debut was Munyurangabo, a movie set in Rwanda, a collaboration with students at an international relief base in Kigali, the capital city. It tells an intimate story about the friendship between two boys in the aftermath of the Rwandan genocide. Chung had accompanied his wife Valerie, an art therapist, to Rwanda in 2006 when she volunteered to work with those affected by the 1994 genocide. He taught a film-making class at a relief base in Kigali. The movie was an opportunity to present the contemporary reality of Rwanda and to provide his students with practical film training. After he developed a nine-page outline with co-writer Samuel Gray Anderson, Chung shot the film over 11 days, working with a team of nonprofessional actors Chung found through local orphanages and with his students as crew members.

Munyurangabo premiered at the 2007 Cannes Film Festival as an Official Selection and played as an official selection at top film festivals worldwide, including the Busan International Film Festival, the Toronto International Film Festival, the Berlin International Film Festival, the Rotterdam International Film Festival, Roger Ebert's Ebertfest, and AFI Fest in Hollywood, where it won the festival's Grand Prize. It was an official selection of the New Directors/New Films Festival at New York's Lincoln Center and the Museum of Modern Art. The film received critical acclaim, and Chung was nominated at the Independent Spirit Awards ("Someone to Watch," 2008) and the Gotham Awards. 

Chung's second film, Lucky Life (2010), was developed with the support of Kodak Film and the Cinéfondation at the Cannes Film Festival. Inspired by the poetry of Gerald Stern, the film premiered at the 2010 Tribeca Film Festival in New York City and has screened at festivals worldwide.

In 2012 Chung was named a United States Artists (USA) Fellow.

Chung's third film, Abigail Harm (2012), is based on the Korean folktale "The Woodcutter and the Nymph". It stars Amanda Plummer, Will Patton, and Burt Young and was produced by Eugene Suen and Samuel Gray Anderson. Shot on location in New York City, the film was an official selection at the Busan International Film Festival, Torino Film Festival, San Diego Asian Film Festival, CAAMFest, and winner of the Grand Prize and Best Director at Los Angeles Asian Pacific Film Festival.

In addition to film-making, Chung mentors young Rwandan film-makers through Almond Tree Rwanda, the Rwandan outpost for his U.S.-based production company, Almond Tree Films. Almond Tree Rwanda has produced several highly regarded shorts that have traveled to international festivals. Chung also co-directed the 2015 Rwandan documentary I Have Seen My Last Born with Anderson. Produced by Chung, Anderson, John Kwezi, and Eugene Suen, the film focuses on the family relations and history of a genocide survivor in modern-day Rwanda. 

He wrote and directed the semiautobiographical film Minari (2020), which was released to critical acclaim. Chung wrote the film in the summer of 2018, by which time he was considering retiring from film-making and accepted a teaching job at the University of Utah's Asia Campus in Incheon. Recalling this period, he said "I figured I might have just one shot at making another film ... I needed to make it very personal and throw in everything I was feeling." 

In 2020, it was initially announced that Chung would direct and rewrite the live-action adaptation of the anime film Your Name, replacing Marc Webb as director. In July 2021, Chung departed the project, citing scheduling issues.

He is also developing a romance film set in New York and Hong Kong, produced by Plan B and MGM.

In December 2022, Chung was in talks and hired to direct the sequel to Jan de Bont's Twister, titled Twisters, set to be released in July 2024.

On January 16, 2023, he was announced to direct an episode of the third season of the Disney+ series, The Mandalorian.

Filmography

Films

Television

Awards and nominations

References

External links
 
 Official Personal Site
 Almond Tree Films, Production Company Site

1978 births
21st-century American male writers
21st-century American screenwriters
American film directors of Korean descent
American male screenwriters
Film directors from Arkansas
Film directors from Colorado
Living people
People from Washington County, Arkansas
Screenwriters from Arkansas
Screenwriters from Colorado
Sundance Film Festival award winners
University of Utah alumni
Writers from Denver
Yale College alumni